Carnikava Station is a railway station on the Zemitāni–Skulte Railway.

References 

Railway stations in Latvia